Trioceros wiedersheimi, the Mount Lefo chameleon or Wiedersheim's montane chameleon, is a species of chameleon found in Cameroon and Nigeria.

References

Trioceros
Reptiles described in 1910
Taxa named by Fritz Nieden
Reptiles of Cameroon
Reptiles of Nigeria